Ji Xi may refer to:

 Duke Yang of Lu
 Marquis Mu of Cai